The black-tailed mouse (Peromyscus melanurus) is a species of rodent in the family Cricetidae endemic to Mexico.

References

Musser, G. G. and M. D. Carleton. (2005). Superfamily Muroidea. pp. 894–1531 in Mammal Species of the World a Taxonomic and Geographic Reference. D. E. Wilson and D. M. Reeder eds. Johns Hopkins University Press, Baltimore.

Peromyscus
Endemic mammals of Mexico
Mammals described in 1909
Taxonomy articles created by Polbot